Chaim David Lippe (December 22, 1823, at Stanisławów, Kingdom of Galicia and Lodomeria – August 26, 1900, at Vienna) was an Austrian Jewish publisher and bibliographer.

For some time he was cantor and instructor in religion at Eperies, Hungary, but he left that town for Vienna, where he conducted a Jewish publishing-house, which issued several popular works. He himself edited a bibliographical lexicon of modern Jewish literature ("Ch. D. Lippe's Bibliographisches Lexicon der Gesammten Jüdischen Literatur der Gegenwart und Address-Anzeiger", Vienna, 1881; 2d ed. 1900).

External links 
 Jewishencyclopedia.com

1823 births
1900 deaths
People from Ivano-Frankivsk
People from the Kingdom of Galicia and Lodomeria
Ukrainian Jews
Austrian bibliographers
Hazzans
Austro-Hungarian Jews
Jews from Galicia (Eastern Europe)
Austrian people of Ukrainian-Jewish descent
Austrian publishers (people)
19th-century Austrian male singers